Dave Branch or David Branch may refer to:

 David Branch (ice hockey) (born 1948), Canadian ice hockey administrator
 David Branch (fighter) (born 1981), American mixed martial artist